Hue is the gradation of color.

Hue may also refer to:

Places
 Huế, an ancient capital of Vietnam
 Roman Catholic Archdiocese of Huế
 Hue, Ohio, an unincorporated community in the United States

Other uses
 Hue (name), a list of people with the surname, given name or nickname
 Hue (software), an open source SQL Cloud Editor for browsing, querying and visualizing data
 Hue (video game)
 Hue (wargame), a board game
 Huế Beer
 Hue F.C., a Vietnamese football club
 Huế Railway Station
 Huế University
 Battle of Huế (1968), part of the Vietnam War
 Hokkaido University of Education
 hue, ISO 639-3 code for the San Francisco Del Mar dialect of the Huave language, spoken in Mexico
 Philips Hue, a line of LED color changing light bulbs

See also
 HEW (disambiguation)
 Treaty of Hué (disambiguation)
 Hues (disambiguation)
 Huey (disambiguation)
 USS Hué City